Tribrachidium heraldicum is a tri-radially symmetric fossil animal that lived in the late Ediacaran (Vendian) seas. In life, it was hemispherical in form. T. heraldicum is the best known member of the extinct group Trilobozoa.

Etymology
The specific name T. heraldicum references the similarity of the pattern of this fossil with the well-known heraldic triskelion design, such as the coat of arms of the Isle of Man.

Occurrence
Tribrachidium fossils were first discovered in the Ediacara Member of the Rawnslay Quartzite, Flinders Ranges in South Australia. This fossil is also known from the Mogilev Formation in the Dniester River Basin, Podolia, Ukraine and from the Verkhovka, Zimnegory and Yorga formations in the White Sea area of the Arkhangelsk Region, Russia. This fossil is also known from the Sonia Formation of Marwar Supergroup near Jodhpur, India.

Description
T. heraldicum is preserved as negative impressions on the base of sandstone beds. These fossils have a circular, three-lobe form, with straight or trefoil-like edges; they are usually covered by numerous radial branched furrows. The central part of the fossil has three hooked ridges ("arms"). The lobes are twisted into weak spirals.

Feeding Method
In a 2015 study, Rahman et al. proposed that Tribrachidium heraldicum used a rare 'gravity settling' mode of suspension feeding based on computational fluid dynamics simulations, which showed that water flow was directed passively by the arms, funneling it towards three depressions (‘apical pits’) where water flow slowed down so that food particles would fall out of suspension.

Reconstruction and affinity

Tribrachidium was originally described by Martin Glaessner as a problematic organism, one that is excluded from all known major groups of animals by its tri-radial symmetry. However, Tribrachidium'''s superficial resemblance to edrioasteroid echinoderms was well known to researchers and discussed. Later, Glaessner rejected any putative affinities of this animal with any known phyla, leaving the status of its taxonomy uncertain. Originally, the various structures on the poorly preserved Australian specimens were interpreted as tentacles, peculiar arms and mouth, but later this interpretation was rejected. Its mode of locomotion in life also remains unknown.

With the discovery of the closely related Albumares and Anfesta, along with the discoveries of much better-preserved Russian specimens, Mikhail Fedonkin proposed for these animals the new taxon, Trilobozoa – an extinct group of tri-radially symmetrical coelenterate-grade animals. Originally, Trilobozoa was erected as a separate class in the phylum Coelenterata, but after Coelenterata was divided into separate phyla Cnidaria and Ctenophora, the Trilobozoa was transferred to the rank of phylum.

M. Fedonkin has shown that the fossil of Tribrachidium is an imprint of the upper side of the animal's body, with some elements of its external and internal anatomy. The radial furrows on the fossil are radial grooves on the surface of the living animal, while the three hooked ridges in central part of the fossil are imprints of cavities within the body. Tribrachidium was a soft-bodied benthic organism that temporarily attached (but did not accrete) to the substrate of its habitat (microbial mats).

See also

 TrilobozoaGehlingia Albumares brunsae Anfesta stankovskii List of Ediacaran genera''
 Triskelion

References

External links
Palaeos dendrogram
Ediacara Assemblage University of Bristol
Anatomical Information Content in the Ediacaran Fossils and Their Possible Zoological Affinities, Jerry Dzik, Instytut Paleobiologii PAN, Twarda 51/55, 00-818 Warszawa, Poland

Trilobozoa
Enigmatic prehistoric animal genera
Monotypic prehistoric animal genera
Ediacaran life
Fossils of Australia
Fossils of Russia
White Sea fossils